The Surrey Commercial Docks were a large group of docks in Rotherhithe, South East London, located on the south bank (the Surrey side) of the River Thames. 

The docks operated in one form or another from 1696 to 1969. Most were subsequently filled in and redeveloped for residential housing, and the area is now known as Surrey Quays, although the name Surrey Docks is retained for the electoral ward.

History
The sparsely populated Rotherhithe peninsula was originally wet marshland alongside the river. It was unsuitable for farming, but its riverside location just downstream from the City of London made it an ideal site for docks. The area had long been associated with maritime activities: in July 1620 the Pilgrim Fathers' ship the Mayflower sailed from Rotherhithe for Southampton, to begin loading food and supplies for the voyage to New England, and a major Royal Navy dockyard was located just down the river at Deptford. In 1696, Howland Great Wet Dock (named after the family who owned the land) was dug out to form the largest dock of its time, able to accommodate 120 sailing ships.

By the mid-18th century the dock had become a base for Arctic whalers and was renamed Greenland Dock. However, by the 19th century an influx of commercial traffic from Scandinavia and the Baltic (principally timber) and Canada (foodstuffs for London's population) led to Greenland Dock being greatly expanded and other docks being dug to accommodate the increasing number of vessels. Eventually, 85% of the peninsula, an area of 460 acres (1.9 km2), was covered by a system of nine docks, six timber ponds and a canal. Several of the docks were named after the origins of their customers' cargos, hence Canada Dock, Quebec Pond, Norway Dock and Russia Dock. The Grand Surrey Canal was opened in 1807 to link the docks with inland destinations, but proved a commercial failure and only 3½ miles of it were ever built. 

The docks evolved a distinctive working culture, quite different from that of the Isle of Dogs across the river. A characteristic sight of the docks were the "deal porters", dockers who specialised in carrying huge baulks of deal (timber) across their shoulders and wore special headgear to protect their heads from the rough wood. 

The decline of the docks set in after World War II, when they suffered massive damage from German air raids. The South Dock was pumped dry and used for construction of some of the concrete caissons which made up the Mulberry Harbours used on D-Day. When the shipping industry adopted the container system of cargo transportation, the docks were unable to accommodate the much larger vessels needed by containerisation. They finally closed for lack of custom in 1969. The Grand Surrey Canal was closed in 1971 and was subsequently drained and filled in. The area remained derelict for over a decade, with much of the warehousing demolished and over 90% of the docks filled in. The only surviving areas of open water were Greenland Dock, South Dock, remnants of Canada Dock (renamed Canada Water), and a basin renamed Surrey Water. In 1981, the Conservative government of Prime Minister Margaret Thatcher established the London Docklands Development Corporation to redevelop the former dockyard areas east of the City of London, including the Surrey Docks.

The area today

During the 1980s and early 1990s, the Surrey Docks were extensively redeveloped, and renamed Surrey Quays. Over 5,500 new homes were built, ranging from individual detached housing to large apartment complexes. South Dock was converted into a marina – now the largest in London – and a watersports centre was constructed on Greenland Dock. Canada Water and the infilled Russia Dock became wildlife reserves, with a woodland park planted on the latter site. Most of Norway Dock was re-excavated to form a water feature surrounded by residential development, and another ornamental feature, the Albion Channel, was created along the eastern side of the former Albion Dock, linking Canada and Surrey Waters. Leisure facilities and a number of light industrial plants were also built, notably a new printing works for Associated Newspapers, the publisher of the London Evening Standard and the Daily Mail. 

In July 1988, the Surrey Quays shopping centre was opened as the centrepiece of the redevelopment (and rebranding) of the area. The nearby London Underground station was renamed as Surrey Quays a few months later. 

Surrey Docks is also a ward of the London Borough of Southwark. The population of this ward at the 2011 Census was 13,435.

See also
 Canada Water
 Greenland Dock
 Russia Dock Woodland
 South Dock
 Grand Surrey Canal

References

External links
 LDDC Completion Booklet - Surrey Docks

London docks
Geography of the London Borough of Southwark
Port of London
Rotherhithe